Chidush (also transliterated as chiddush, hiddush or hidush), sometimes used in its plural form, chidushim, is a  novel interpretation or approach.

 
Historically referring to Torah topics,

 
the term is widely used in rabbinic literature

 
to describe a form of innovation that is made inside the system of the halakha, as distinguished from shinuy, an innovation outside tradition.

Etymology
 comes from the Hebrew root word , meaning . The usage of the word in this context originated from the language of Talmudic analysis and argumentation in the Gemara. It passed into Yiddish, where it is at times used informally.

In rabbinic literature
Nachmanides states that it is an "obligation imposed upon us to search through the subjects of the Torah and the precepts and bring to light their hidden contents".

What "powers" Chidushim? MaaYana Shel Torah asks regarding "VaYayLech Moshe" (31:1) - where did he go? and answers that he went into everyone: NichNas Moshe Rabbeinu LeToch ToCho Shel Kol Adam MiYisroel. This, he writes, is the basis of people having/writing ChiDuShim.

Although "any chiddush (novel idea) which a reputable disciple will ever come up with was already given to Moses by Sinai," in one rabbi's understanding of a particular ruling, he wrote: "I have always understood Rabbi Feinstein to be insisting on a balance between innovation and tradition.

Chidushim are the ongoing results of a process and, as a form of Kavod HaTorah, we're required not to forget them. New ways to recall what we learn can be a form of chidush.

Rulings vs. understanding
There is a difference between issuing a ruling, meaning to "distinguish the case at hand from the precident (sic)... to solve a problem," and an understanding of something.  Even in the latter case, he writes "What Rabbi Feinstein means is that one should not be innovative (mechadesh) just to innovate."
 Although it is a Torah command for Kohanim to bless the people, there might be a chidush whether it is obligatory upon those who are not Kohanim to make themselves available to receive these blessings.

 Can always be new? Psalm (27:4) has King David asking that he "dwell.. and visit.." Which is it? Rabbi Yissocher Frand explains the experience as "The Pitfall of Consistency: Been There, Done That." This question is so important that it is a notable part of what many add to the daily prayer service, "twice daily from Rosh Chodesh Elul until Shemini Atzeret".

Forms of chidush

Notarikon
One form is called Notarikon.

 Shabbat (שַׁבָּת), the Sabbath, is a day of rest. The word is spelled with 3 Hebrew letters. The Notarikon of the three-word phrase  "Shayna b'Shabbat Taanug"  (שינה בשבת תענוג) (translation: "(Extra) Sleep on Shabbat is considered a Delight!") spells Shabbat (שַׁבָּת).

 By itself it might seem like at best a minor chidush. When published amidst a collection of many other such 3-word phrases about the day of rest, the title has justified use of the plural form: chidushim.

Gematria
Another is finding a Gematria.

Lechadesh (to renew)
The above term points to a need for something "old" to be seen in a new light. A multi-volume commentary on Mesillas Yesharim compares and contrasts this to emotional insight, a type of Chidush where "something which is novel emotionally" illuminates the value of an idea one already knew intellectually, and brings "a new internalization".

History
Among the first post-Geonic writers of chidushim are:
 Joseph ibn Migash wrote the first published cḥidushim incorporating commentaries on halakha in the Talmud
 Abraham ben David de Posquières (RABaD)
 Meir ben Todros HaLevi Abulafia (c. 1170 – 1244)
 Nachmanides was the first to write chidushim on the Chumash.

By the late sixteenth century, with printing an established technology, hair-splitting distinctions into the treatment of halakic-Talmudic themes became more frequent, with chidush-driven works such as those by:
 Rabbi Meir Lublin, MaHaRam, author of Chiddushe Maharam Lublin
 Solomon Luria ("MaHaRSHaL")
 Rabbi Samuel Eliezer Edels ("MeHaRSHA")

A counter-intuitive use of the term was the Chasam Sofer's novel interpretation of the phrase Chadash asur min haTorah, ("'new' is forbidden by the Torah").  The phrase as originally used is regarding the laws of keeping kosher, whereas his use was regarding changes being made by the Reform movement in Europe: it was a way of saying no - but using a pun.

Current usage
 has become assimilated into American English. In its regular use, it means an unusual or innovative idea or point, though the word is also commonly used in an ironic or humorous fashion, so as to imply that the statement in question is nothing new.

Book titles may use the word:
 The work known as Chidushei HaRim
 uses the Hebrew word  in the possessive form, and means chidushim of.
 Another form is 
 (name of person): Chidushim or Chidushim of (name of person)

Chidushei father and son: 
 "I once learned a very useful chidush (novel idea) in the name of Harav Moshe Feinstein zt"l, concerning ..."
 "He is famous for his original insights on ..." (review: Rabbi Dovid Feinstein - Kol Dodi On Torah)

See also
 Yiddish words used in English

References

External links
 The command to be mechadesh -- for the right reasons
 What is the importance of Chiddush
 Lessons from Rabbi Elazar ben Aruch
 CHIDDUSH - Online Beit Medrish

Jewish texts
Orthodox Judaism
Rabbinic literature
Torah study
Hebrew words and phrases in Jewish law